The 2017–18 Liga Femenina de Baloncesto, also known as Liga Dia for sponsorship reasons, is the 55th season of the Spanish basketball women's league. It started on 30 September 2017 with the first round of the regular season and ended in April 2018 with the final.

Teams

Promotion and relegation (pre-season)
A total of 14 teams contest the league, including 12 sides from the 2016–17 season and two promoted from the 2016–17 Liga Femenina 2.

Teams promoted from Liga Femenina 2
Snatt's Femení Sant Adrià
Movistar Estudiantes

Venues and locations

Regular season

League table

Positions by round
The table lists the positions of teams after completion of each round.

Results

Playoffs

Quarterfinals

(4) Star Center–Uni Ferrol vs. (5) Lointek Gernika Bizkaia

(3) Mann-Filter vs. (6) IDK Gipuzkoa

Semifinals

(1) Perfumerías Avenida vs. (4) Star Center–Uni Ferrol

(2) Spar CityLift Girona vs. (3) Mann-Filter

Final

(1) Perfumerías Avenida vs. (2) Spar CityLift Girona

Stats leaders in regular season

Points

Rebounds

Assists

Performance Index Rating

References and notes

External links
 Official website 

Spain
Fem
Liga Femenina de Baloncesto seasons
Liga